Waking Up Is Hard to Do is the second studio album by the American indie rock band Giant Drag, released on March 5, 2013 on Full Psycho Records, the band's own label. It is the band's first full-length release of original material since Hearts and Unicorns (2005) and was released as a digital download on Giant Drag's Bandcamp music store.

Reception
Marie Wood of Drowned In Sound gave the album an 8 out of 10 rating, writing: "The main draw of the album... is that like Daniel Johnston, Eels and Pinkerton-era Weezer, Hardy still strikes the golden balance of juxtaposing fear, despair and rejection with sugary pop melodies and a dry near arid sense of humour that sweetens the blow of the heavy subjects at hand making them highly relatable."

Track listing

References

External links
 at Bandcamp

2013 albums
Giant Drag albums